Roy Bailey may refer to:

Roy Bailey (politician) (1928–2018), Canadian Progressive Conservative (formerly social credit) politician from Saskatchewan
Roy Bailey (folk singer) (1935–2018), British socialist folk singer
Roy Bailey (footballer, born 1932) (1932–1993), English footballer
Roy Bailey (Australian footballer) (1889–1935), Australian rules footballer
Roy Bailey (athlete), Jamaican athlete